South Korean band N.Flying has released two studio albums, eight extended plays, and one single album.

Album

Studio albums

Reissue albums

Single albums

Extended plays

Singles

Korean singles

Japanese singles

Soundtrack appearances

Compilation appearances

See also 
 Cha Hun discography
 J.don discography
 Yoo Hwe-seung discography

References 

Discographies of South Korean artists
K-pop music group discographies